Ladybrand is a small agricultural town in the Free State province of South Africa, situated 18 km from Maseru, the capital of Lesotho. Ladybrand is one of five towns that forms the Mantsopa Local Municipality.  Founded in 1867 following the Basotho Wars, it was named after Lady (Catharina) Brand, the wife of the president of the Orange Free State, Johannes Brand.

The settlement of Ladybrand was created by Voortrekkers to give them control over the territories conquered and captured after the above-mentioned Basotho war. In 1900, during the Second Anglo-Boer War, Ladybrand came under the control of the British.

Notable residents
Nico Diederichs - State President of South Africa from 1975 to 1978.
Arthur Setaba Pitso, an SACP supporter who was stabbed to death by unidentified persons at his home in Ladybrand, OFS, on 28 October 1972. Mr Pitso had organised stayaways, boycotts and other political activities, and was labelled a troublemaker by police in the area. 
Kobie Coetsee - South African lawyer, National Party politician and administrator as well as a negotiator during the country's transition to democracy.
Lehlohonolo Majoro - Cape Town City FC Striker 1986–present
Lefa Tsutsulupa - Morokwa Swallows Midfielder 1975-2013
 Dulcie van den Bergh (born Smit) (1928–97),the actress, lived in Ladybrand as a child with her brother Stefaans (Stephanus Johannes Petrus) and sister Annemie. Parents were Anna Elisabeth (Venter) and Stephanus Johannes Smit.
Relebohile Pitso born 21 April 1993, Top 16 finalist for Miss Bachelorette South Africa. A top 10 finalist of the face of Miss Signature and a founder of an NGO called Hands Of Pure Hope and also a founder of Mr and Miss Ladybrand teen. She was born and bred in Ladybrand. Started school at Yeshua pre-primary, went to Ladybrand Primary and completed matric at Ladybrand high school in the year 2011.
Wagga Wagga Likoebe - Kaizer Chiefs Winger 1977-1982
Pule Lechesa -  Poet, literary critic, essayist.

References

External links
 

Populated places in the Mantsopa Local Municipality
Populated places founded by Afrikaners
Populated places established in 1868
1868 establishments in the Orange Free State